Mariner-Mars 1964 can refer to two American spaceprobes:
 Mariner 3
 Mariner 4